The Wild Swans (Dikiye lebedi) is a 1962 Soviet traditionally animated feature film directed by the husband-and-wife team of Mikhail Tsekhanovsky and Vera Tsekhanovskaya. The film is based on the story of the same name by Hans Christian Andersen. Unusual for Soviet films of this period, and especially for animated films, it was produced in widescreen. It was produced at the Soyuzmultfilm studio in Moscow.

Plot
The princess Elisa and her eleven brothers live in peace and happiness until their father marries again and brings home a new queen. She turns out to be an evil witch. With her magic, she tries to curse Elisa, but Elisa's good heart repel the curse. Instead, the queen resorts to blackening Elisa's face and dirtying her hair, making her unrecognisable. She also attempts to turn the eleven princes into black, ugly birds, but because of their good hearts, the curse is only partly successful: they turn into beautiful white swans.

The queen chases them out of the castle, and the next morning, Elisa is chased out as well because her father didn't recognise her. Left with nothing, she sets out to find her brothers. After many years, she finally finds them, and after learning from a crow that the curse can be broken by herself, she has to knit eleven sweaters out of tall, burning nettles, and has to take a vow of silence until the last sweater is finished and not be distracted.

While she works on the sweaters, she meets a king who falls in love with her and lets her live in his castle. However, an archbishop conspires with the King's fiancé, his (the archbishop's) niece, to get rid of her by making people think she is a witch. She is almost burnt on the stake, but at the last second, her brothers come to the rescue. She throws the sweaters over them, the curse is broken, and she is able to tell her story and return the king's love.

Home video releases
 DVD: Золотая коллекция любимых мультфильмов – 4. PAL, no subtitles. Contains: The Wild Swans, Argonauts (20 min), The Boatswain and the Parrot (series 1–4, 38 min), A Blue Puppy (20 min)
 VHS and MPEG-4 versions containing only the film

Creators

Art features 
The film expert Pyotr Bagrov in the analysis of the Soviet "andersen's" filmography puts the animated film "Wild Swans" on a special place, separating its literary basis from other fairy-tales of Andersen: "It, in general, and not the fairy-tale. It is an ancient Danish legend". Respectively, other, in comparison with other animated screen versions, appeared also a graphic manner in which the tape is created: "The extended, "Gothic" people and rocks — and at the same time the plane, medieval and primitive image". Bagrov also notes typical for game cinema, but rare in animation parallel installation.

English versions 
Three different English versions of the film exists, each one heavily re-edited and with different soundtracks.

The first English release in 1964 was done by CCM Films under the banner CARTOON CLASSICS, INC., with ADR Script and direction by Bernard Evslin. This version rearranges shots from the movie and adds narration in scenes where there originally weren't and some of the musical numbers were cut.

The second English release was done in 1986 by Kidpix and released on video by Just For Kids under the title Swans. This version replaces the songs with pop songs from the music group Bullets.

The third dub was done in 1995 by Films by Jove for the series Stories from My Childhood. This version rearranges scenes and totally rebus the music score with a new one provided by Thomas Chase and Steve Rucker, as well as all new songs by Rucker, Chase, and Pamela Phillips Oland. This version also includes celebrities such as Cathy Moriarty, Danielle Brisebois, Jo Beth Williams, and James Coburn. This episode was briefly released on DVD by Image Entertainment.

See also 
 History of Russian animation
 List of animated feature-length films

References

External links 
 The Wild Swans at Animator.ru
 
  (Official Russian)
  (Russian with English subtitles)
  (English No.1)
  (English No.2)
 The Wild Swans at myltik.ru 

1962 films
Films based on fairy tales
Films based on works by Hans Christian Andersen
Russian animated films
Soviet animated films
1960s Russian-language films
Soyuzmultfilm
1962 animated films
Works based on The Wild Swans